Samuel Cohen may refer to:

Sam Cohen (Australian politician) (1918–1969), Australian Senator
Samuel Cohen (New South Wales politician) (1812–1861), member of the New South Wales Legislative Assembly
Samuel or Shmuel Cohen, composer of the Israeli national anthem "Hatikvah"
Samuel Arthur Cohen (1896–1977), known as Sam Bohne, American Major League Baseball player
Samuel "Mouli" Cohen (born 1958), Israeli-born American businessman
Samuel T. Cohen (1921–2010), American physicist
Sam Cohen (musician) (born 1979), American rock singer, songwriter and guitarist
Sammy Cahn (1913–1993), American lyricist and musician, born Samuel Cohen

See also
Sam Waley-Cohen (born 1982), English amateur jockey and businessman